Highway Ridge is a ridge extending eastward from Shark Fin Glacier to Foster Glacier in the Royal Society Range, Antarctica. It was named by the New Zealand Geographic Board in 1994 following work in the area by a New Zealand Geological Survey field party, 1977–78. The name alludes to the excellent access that the ridge provides from the lower part of Foster Glacier to Shark Fin Glacier.

References

Ridges of Victoria Land
Scott Coast